Louis Natheaux (born Louis F. Natho; December 10, 1894 – August 23, 1942) was an American film actor. He appeared in more than eighty films between 1919 and 1942.

Born in Danville, Illinois, Natheaux performed in vaudeville and in a Chautauqua play.

Partial filmography

 The Super-Sex (1922)
The Fast Set (1924)
The Coming of Amos (1925)
The Clinging Vine (1926)
The Country Doctor (1927)
Dress Parade (1927)
Fighting Love (1927)
Turkish Delight (1927)
The Cop (1928)
Stool Pigeon (1928)
Weary River (1929)
Why Be Good? (1929)
Girls Gone Wild (1929)
Broadway Babies (1929)
This Mad World (1930)
Murder on the Roof (1930)
The Squealer  (1930)
Sinister Hands (1932)
Behind Jury Doors (1932)
The Fighting Code (1933)

References

External links
 
 Short biography at AllMovie

1894 births
1942 deaths
American male film actors
20th-century American male actors
Vaudeville performers
Actors from Illinois